Cockpit is an Indian Bengali language drama film directed by Kamaleshwar Mukherjee and produced by Dev under the banner of Dev Entertainment Ventures. The film features Dev, Koel Mallick and Rukmini Maitra in the lead roles. This is the second time Kamaleshwar Mukherjee and Dev are working as a director-actor duo, after the 2013 film Chander Pahar. The film got positive response from critics and audience and was a box office 'hit'.

Plot 
Cockpit is a story inspired by true incidents. The story follows a flight that is going from Mumbai to Kolkata and gets hit from bad turbulent weather. The film will follow as the pilot attempts to land the plane, even with damaged engines.

Cast 
 Dev as Captain Dibyendu Rakshit
 Koel Mallick as Riya Dev Rakshit
 Rukmini Maitra as Kirti Sachdev
 Prosenjit Chatterjee as Captain Dibakar Rakshit, Dibyendu's late father (flashback)
 Bulbuli Panja as Captain Dibakar Rakshit's wife/ Captain Dibyendu Rakshit's mother
 Ziaul Roshan as Neel Banerjee, Dibyendu's assistant
 Shataf Figar as air traffic controller
 Paran Bandopadhyay as Mr. Dutta
 Priyanka Sarkar as Afreen Hamidi
 Raj Chakraborty as Shanu Ghoshal
 Anindya Chatterjee as Kitty's Father
 Saayoni Ghosh as Monica / Kitty's mother
 Arshiya Mukherjee as Kitty
 Roja Paromita Dey as Justin, Kriti's friend and an air hostess
 Ambarish Bhattacharya as a passenger in the plane
 Nader Chowdhury as a passenger in the plane
 Abhisekh Singh as Ushnish
 Nasimul Haque
 Sonali Roy
 Diya Mukherjee
 Padmanava Dasgupta as TV news reporter
 Debomay Mukherjee as plane passenger
 Krishna Kishore Mukhopadhyay as Monica's father-in-law

Production 
The film is produced by Dev, his second production after his film Chaamp. When describing his reason for starring and producing in the film, Dev said "I am trying to do films that are offbeat yet commercial – ones that are out of the box. I can vouch for the concept of Cockpit. It is something no one has dealt with in the past. I am sure the audience will love it.".

Filming
Shooting for the film has taken place in Bangkok, Pattaya, Mumbai and Kolkata. The post-production of the film has been taking place in Mumbai.

Release and reception
The film released on 22 September 2017 on the holiday of Durga Puja. In November 2017, it was announced by Bangladeshi film company Jaaz Multimedia that through an exchange of films with SVF Entertainment, Cockpit will release in Bangladesh.The release date of cockpit in Bangladesh is 8 December.

Critical reception
The Times of India gave the film a 4/5 star rating, calling it a must-watch film. In their review, The Times of India praised the film for exploring a new topic and leaving room for expanding the film into a franchise for other characters, which it described as a "rarity" in an industry full of remakes. While the performances of the main cast was praised, the review criticized Dev's delivery of his English dialogue, describing it as sometimes "barely understood". The heavy use of visual effects was also criticized for being unrealistic, but overall the film was praised in all other aspects from the acting to the music.

Soundtrack 

The soundtrack for the film has been composed by Arindom Chatterjee. The soundtrack contains four songs, including some sung by popular singers Atif Aslam and Arijit Singh. The first single, titled "Mithe Alo", has been sung by Atif Aslam and was released on 23 August 2017. The second single from the album, "Bhalobasa Jaak", is sung by Arijit Singh and Somlata Acharyya Chowdhury and was released on 5 September. "Kolkatar Rasogolla" was released as a single on 12 September. "Khela Shesh" was released as the final single on 19 September. On 15 September the soundtrack was officially released mid-air on a special flight, a first for a Tollywood soundtrack.

World television premiere

The film premiered on television on 14 January 2018 in Zee Bangla and Zee Bangla Cinema.

Accolades 
The film was nominated for multiple awards at the 2018 Filmfare Awards East.

|-
| 2018
| Kamaleswar Mukherjee
| Best Director
| Filmfare Award
| 
| Filmfare Awards East
|
|-
| 2018
| Rukmini Maitra
| Best Actress
| Filmfare Award
| 
| Filmfare Awards East
|
|-
| 2018
| Arijit Singh
| Best Singer (Male)
| Filmfare Award
| 
| Filmfare Awards east for the film Cockpit
|-
| 2018
| Rukmini Maitra
| Best Debut (Female)
| Filmfare Award
| 
| Filmfare Awards EastAlso for the film Chaamp
|

References

External links
 
 

Bengali-language Indian films
2010s Bengali-language films
Films scored by Arindam Chatterjee
Films directed by Kamaleshwar Mukherjee
2010s adventure drama films
Indian adventure drama films
Indian films based on actual events
Films produced by Dev (Bengali actor)
2017 drama films
Films set on airplanes
Indian aviation films